Fall of Kabul may refer to:

 Battle of Kabul (1992–1996), the capture of Kabul by the Taliban in 1996
 Fall of Kabul (2001), the capture of Kabul by the Northern Alliance in 2001, as a part of the United States invasion of Afghanistan
 Fall of Kabul (2021), the recapture of Kabul by the Taliban in 2021

See also 
 Siege of Kabul (disambiguation)